Eduardo Pitta (born 9 August 1949) is a Portuguese poet, fiction writer and essayist.

Bio and work 

Born in Lourenço Marques, now Maputo, on 9 August 1949, he lived in Mozambique until 1975. He had published ten books of poetry. A large selection of that corpus of poems was collected in Desobediência, 2011. It is represented in several anthologies of contemporary Portuguese poetry. A significant number of his essays and critical writings have been collected in six volumes. With his trilogy of short-stories Persona, 2000, his writing underwent a tectonic movement. One of these stories, Kalahari, was translated by Alison Aiken and published in Chroma, a Queer Literary Journal, from London. In 2013 published a memoir, Um Rapaz a Arder. His poetry and prose have appeared in various magazines and anthologies in Portugal, Spain, France, Brasil, Colombia, England, Israel, USA and, in his early years (1968–1975), in Mozambique. In addition to the short story The Stratagem, published in the collective volume, has published several short stories in the magazine Egoísta. He did literary criticism in the magazines Colóquio-Letras (1987–2018), LER (1990–2006) and Sábado (2011–2022), as well as in the newspapers Diário de Notícias (1996–1998) and Público (2005–2011). Between 1994 and 2006, he was the author of the poetry criticism section O Som & o Sentido for the magazine LER. In the same magazine, between 2008 and 2014, he published chronicles in the column Heterodoxias.

Personal life 
Pitta was legally married in 2010 with Jorge Neves, his partner since 1972.

Works

Poetry

Fiction

Essay and critic

Memoir

Edited works

References 

«A Linguagem da Desordem», review by Eugénio Lisboa, http://coloquio.gulbenkian.pt/bib/sirius.exe/getrec?mfn=4065&_template=singleRecord [archive]

«A marca da excisão na poesia de Eduardo Pitta», review by Ana Luísa Amaral. http://coloquio.gulbenkian.pt/bib/sirius.exe/getrec?mfn=7942&_template=singleRecord [archive]

«Persona», review by Fernando Matos Oliveira, http://coloquio.gulbenkian.pt/bib/sirius.exe/getrec?mfn=8233&_template=singleRecord [archive]

«Pompas Fúnebres», review by Hugo Pinto Santos, http://coloquio.gulbenkian.pt/bib/sirius.exe/getrec?mfn=18876&_template=singleRecord [archive]

External links 
 Official web page
 Blog

1949 births
Living people
Portuguese male poets
Portuguese male novelists
Portuguese essayists
Portuguese bloggers
Portuguese LGBT poets
Portuguese LGBT novelists
Male bloggers